Nur Mohammadi Zamaneh (also Romanized as Nūr Moḩammadī Zamāneh; also known as Nūr Moḩammadī) is a village in Khaveh-ye Shomali Rural District, in the Central District of Delfan County, Lorestan Province, Iran. At the 2006 census, its population was 225, in 45 families.

References 

Towns and villages in Delfan County